Lajos Nagy (born 26 March 1924, date of death unknown) was a Hungarian rower. He competed in two events at the 1948 Summer Olympics.

References

1924 births
Year of death missing
Hungarian male rowers
Olympic rowers of Hungary
Rowers at the 1948 Summer Olympics
Rowers from Budapest